OmniWriter is a word processor for the Commodore 64 home computer HESware. Called the "dean of Commodore 64 word-processing programs" in Stewart Brand's Whole Earth Software Catalog and Review, OmniWritersold at a list price of USD$79. It was specifically recommended for home business use.

The package included a reference card that fits around the Commodore's function keys, customizable colors and a scrolling 80-column width display. The maximum file size is 23 pages, but multiple files can be chained for printing. OmniWriter can import up to 240 columns of data from Microsoft Multiplan.

References

External links
 

Commodore 64 software
Word processors
Discontinued software